is a private high school located in Koganei, Tokyo, Japan.

Background
The International Christian University High School was founded in 1978 and is dedicated to the principles of the Christian faith and the Universal Declaration of Human Rights. The purpose of the school is to educate young people by providing them with the academic and social skills needed for making decisions based on eternal values, while cultivating a discriminating intelligence necessary in becoming responsible citizens of the world.

About two-thirds of the student body are students returning to Japan with valuable educational experiences abroad. Classes are divided according to achievement levels.

The whole curriculum is directed towards both high academic and high moral standards, and is designed to prepare its graduates to proceed to a broad spectrum of first-rate universities. Students who show outstanding results in academic studies and school activities are recommended to the International Christian University.

Notable alumni
Mai Demizu, announcer and television presenter
Hitoshi Murayama, physicist
Reina Triendl, model and actress
Koki Uchiyama, voice actor

See also
International Christian University

External links
 School website in Japanese
 School Prospectus Page 1-7
 School Prospectus Page 8-11
 School Prospectus Page 12-17 
 ICU High School Radio News
 School Now in Japanese
 ICUHS Alumni in Japanese
 Japan ICU Foundation

High school
Christian schools in Japan
Educational institutions established in 1978
High schools in Tokyo
1978 establishments in Japan
Koganei, Tokyo